The Cane Run Generating Station is a 640 megawatt (MW), natural gas power plant owned and operated by Louisville Gas and Electric (LG&E). It was formerly a coal power plant until 2015.

History
Cane Run began operation on its first unit in 1954 and expanded to six units by 1969. Its total generating capacity was 943 (MW). Sulfur dioxide scrubber technology, pioneered by LG&E, were installed at this plant in 1973. President Jimmy Carter visited the plant in July 1979 to promote energy security during the 1979 energy crisis. Units 1-3 were retired in 1987. The power plant was mired in a lawsuit in 2013 from nearby residents over its dispersion of coal ash. In preparation of converting to natural gas, Unit 6 was shut down in March 2015. The final two units went offline in June 2015. At the same time, construction of Unit 7 was completed and began running on natural gas. The former coal power plant structure was demolished by implosion on June 8, 2019.

See also

 Louisville Gas & Electric

References

External links
Official website

Energy infrastructure completed in 1962
Former coal-fired power stations in the United States
Natural gas-fired power stations in Kentucky
1962 establishments in Kentucky
Infrastructure in Louisville, Kentucky